Major Singh Uboke (1927-2020) was an Indian politician. He was elected to the Lok Sabha, the lower house of the Parliament of India from the Tarn Taran  constituency of Punjab   as a member of the Shiromani Akali Dal.

References

External links
 Official biographical sketch in Parliament of India website

1927 births
2020 deaths
Shiromani Akali Dal politicians
Lok Sabha members from Punjab, India
India MPs 1996–1997
Politicians from Amritsar district
People from Tarn Taran Sahib